The House in Nightmare Park (known as Crazy House in the U.S.) is a 1973 British comedy horror film directed by Peter Sykes and starring Frankie Howerd, Ray Milland and Hugh Burden. It was one of a number of British comedy films which parodied the successful British horror genre, closely associated with the Hammer Horror films. Its plot follows that of a traditional "Old Dark House" story.

Plot
Struggling actor Foster Twelvetrees (Frankie Howerd) is invited to a large country home by Stewart Henderson (Ray Milland) to perform a dramatic reading for his family.  Outwardly, Stewart is complimentary and enthusiastic, but his more sinister intentions were made clear when earlier he secretly sliced a poster of Twelvetrees.  Whilst they chat, Stewart's sister Jessica (Rosalie Crutchley) and their Indian servant Patel (John Bennett) begin searching through Twelvetrees' luggage.  Twelvetrees nevertheless responds with an unintentional wit and bumbling characteristic throughout the rest of the film.

After they send him to bed, Stewart and Jessica talk cryptically about not being able to find something in his luggage and concluding he must have it elsewhere.  Later on Twelvetrees is chided by Stewart for nearly walking in on a restricted room – Stewart explains his ill brother Victor is in there.  Then during his sleep Twelvetrees is woken to a commotion downstairs: Stewart's other brother Reggie (Hugh Burden) and his daughter Verity (Elizabeth MacLennan) have arrived with Reggie demanding his regular allowance from Victor.  Spying on the proceedings Twelvetrees spots Stewart going elsewhere to see his mother.  The next day, after being introduced to a snake house underground, Twelvetrees secretly goes upstairs to see Stewart's mother: though kept behind a locked door she initially seems extremely polite and explains her family's history of theatrics in India.  Suddenly, she tries to kill Twelvetrees with a knife but he is saved by Patel – the servant explains her presence there is secret lest she be taken away.  Though very unnerved, Stewart persuades Twelvetrees to stay to perform that evening.

Before doing so another brother arrives; Ernest (Kenneth Griffith) and his wife Aggie arrive to demand his regular allowance – both he and Reggie have found their cheques from Victor have been bouncing.  Suspicious that Stewart is trying to change Victor's will to his favour, Reggie and Ernest resolve to stay and make sure that doesn't happen.  In the meantime, Verity persuades Twelvetrees to check up on Victor, and to their shock discover the bed in his room is filled by a dummy.  Confronted, Stewart tells Reggie and Ernest that Victor is dead and reveals another secret: Twelvetrees is in fact Victor's secret son and that he is entitled to everything in Victor's will.  Plus, Stewart is convinced Twelvetrees unknowingly has a clue to where a batch of diamonds are hidden on the estate.  Ernest and Aggie, after their own search, are convinced they've found the clue is a framed misquoted motto and plan to kill Twelvetrees with poison: Stewart foils the plan and works out they know whatever the clue must be. Later that evening during a Henderson family performance Ernest is killed with a stab to the back.
Petrified, Twelvetrees makes a hasty exit only to be pursued by Verity: she convinces him to come back after she reveals the true identity of his father and his place in his will: he is in line to take over his money, the house and its estates.  Whilst confronting his uncles, Foster is told by Verity about the diamonds, their secret location and the fact he might be in possession of a clue to their location.  Whilst he goes for the police Foster gets lost in the forest and eventually finds Patel: he tells him to go in his place.  However, having taken some of his clothes, Patel is mistaken by the Henderson mother and she kills him as he walks through the woods.

Going back to the house, Foster meets up with Verity again to find Jessica – in possession of his framed motto – and Agnes dead by the snakehouse.  Foster explains he received the motto in the post and Verity notices it's inaccurate.  Explaining that it came with a birth certificate, Verity concludes the clue must be in his name.  Foster goes to get it – learning his real name is Nigel Anthony Julian Amadeus Henderson – but comes back to Verity on the floor.  Reggie walks in immediately and says she's dead.  Foster, left alone, works out the clue: his initials form naja – a genus of snake, and he finds a package in the snake house.  Confronted then by Stewart – Reggie having been killed in the interim – Foster refuses to hand it over and a violent chase ensues, but Foster traps Stewart with his mother.  Downstairs, Foster is confronted by an alive Verity pointing a gun at him.  She demands the diamonds and he unwraps the package, throwing the covering paper into the fire.  However, the document inside reveals the covering paper was actually the map to the diamonds hidden in the estate, by the time they realize the map is already burned away.  The film ends with Stewart, Verity and the Henderson mother being taken away in a police cart, whilst a camera shot moves away from Foster beginning to dig in the large grounds outside the house to find the diamonds.

Cast
 Frankie Howerd – Foster Twelvetrees 
 Ray Milland – Stewart Henderson 
 Hugh Burden – Reggie Henderson 
 Kenneth Griffith – Ernest Henderson 
 John Bennett – Patel 
 Rosalie Crutchley – Jessica Henderson 
 Ruth Dunning – Agnes Henderson 
 Elizabeth MacLennan – Verity Henderson 
 Aimée Delamain – Mother 
 Peter Munt – Cabbie

Production
Frankie Howerd later said it was "the film I enjoyed making the most... because it was a comedy thriller and I like that kind of film. The only difficult thing about it involved swamps. It was very physically gruelling to make because I was being chased upstairs and downstairs, ran through swamps, and was generally kicked around. I had to work three days in a pit of live snakes so it was a very tough film to make. But having said that, I enjoyed making the film because it was a good part and good parts don’t come along all that often. It had a good director (Peter Sykes) and if any 
actor has a really good part to play then he’s happy. A comedian is always happy to have a good script he has confidence in. There is nothing worse than having a bad script, knowing it’s a bad script, and having to make the most of it.”

Critical reception
Time Out wrote, "Sykes directs in his best high romantic style (the opening is brilliant) and Howerd restrains himself sufficiently; but though some gags work, towards half time the strain begins to tell and it all falls apart."
British Horror Films called the film, "Very funny, very Hammer...and very, very good. Who says there's only ever been one successful Hammer-alike horror comedy ever produced? Carry On Screaming, you've got competition…"

References

Bibliography
 Hutchings, Peter. British Film Makers: Terence Fisher. Manchester University Press, 2001.

External links
 
 

1973 films
1970s comedy horror films
1973 horror films
1973 comedy films
British comedy horror films
Films about actors
Films set in country houses
Films set in England
Films shot at Pinewood Studios
Films directed by Peter Sykes
Films with screenplays by Clive Exton
Films produced by Clive Exton
1970s English-language films
1970s British films